Kadjebi-Asato Secondary School (KASEC) is a co-educational, boarding senior high school located on the border of two towns known as Kadjebi and Asato  hence, the name Kadjebi-Asato Secondary school. The school is located in the Kadjebi District in the Oti Region of Ghana.

Crest 
The school crest is a combination of a book and an eagle, with a wisdom knot and the motto Consilio et Animis ("By Wisdom and Courage").

History 
The school is one of the trust schools established by Dr. Kwame Nkrumah on 5 September 1959 with the aim of providing second cycle education to children within the catchment area and beyond. It was established under the Ghana Education Trust Fund and funded by the Ghana Cocoa Board. The foundation stone was laid by Ferdinand Goka, the then Volta regional commissioner. The first classes began on 19 January 1960 for 66 boys.

The school celebrated its 60th anniversary in November 2019. The old Students Union - the Kasec Old Students Union (KOSU) - started in the early 1990s in the New York and New Jersey areas of the United States. During this period, initial members met informally at members’ residences to discuss matters of mutual interest and benefit and examine ways to offer support to their alma mater. In February 2009, a few alumni, located in the New York area, gathered together via telephone conferencing to rebuild the KOSU-Global organization.

Headmasters

Campus 
Hall of residence are divided into 6.  and each names was assigned after people who have contributed in diverse ways towards the progress of the school .

Akompi House was named after the late Nana Akompi Finam I, Omanhene of Kadjebi-Akan Traditional Area to recognize and appreciate the pioneering role he played in bringing the school to this location

Konsu House. Konsu is a stream between the school and Asato which empties itself into the Dai River and serves as a source of water to the school

Addo-Yobo House was named in recognition of the dedicated service the first headmaster, Mr. Addo Yobo rendered

Bonsu House was named after the late Nana Osei Bonsu III of Asato Traditional Area to recognize and appreciate the pioneering role he played in bringing the school to this location

Curriculum 
The school provides a broad curriculum, including English, mathematics and sciences (either as integrated science or as separate disciplines of biology, chemistry and physics). In addition, the general arts curriculum offers courses in Christian religious studies, economics, English literature, geography, government, history and music. Language teaching includes French , Twi  and Ewe.

 General arts
 General science
 Home economics
 Visual arts
 General Agriculture

Extracurricular activities 
The School has a long Standing Cadet,  men soccer team,  female soccer team, basketball team, handball, volleyball team and a hockey team with all these bagging a of medals from school competition up to the Zonal levels. The school is also known for it athletes performance. The School band is also used to train  students on their leisure times on how to play instruments such as the Trumpet, drums,Trombone and other musical instruments.

Notable alumni 
 Rashid Bawa, former member of parliament and currently Ghana's Ambassador to Nigeria

References 

1959 establishments in Ghana
High schools in Ghana
Oti Region